This is a list of Royal Navy ship names starting with D, E, and F.

D

 D1
 D2
 D3
 D4
 D5
 D6
 D7
 D8
 D9
 D10
 Dacres
 Daedalus
 
 Daffodil
 Dagger
 Dahlia
 Dainty
 Daisy
 Dakins
 Dalhousie
 Dalrymple
 Dalswinton
 Dame de Grace
 Damerham
 Dampier
 Danae
 Daneman
 Dangereuse
 Daniel
 Dannemark
 Danube
 
 Daphne
 Dapper
 Daring
 Darlaston
 Darsham
 Dart
 Dartington
 Dartmoor
 Dartmouth
 Dasher
 Date Tree
 Dauntless
 Dauphin Royal
 Davenham
 David
 Dawlish
 De Ruyter
 
 Deale Castle
 Deale
 Deane
 Decade
 Decibel
 Decouverte
 Decoy
 Dedaigneuse
 Dee
 Deepwater
 Defence
 Defender
 
 Defiance II
 Defiance III
 Defiance IV
 Dego
 Delaware
 Delft
 Delhi
 Delight
 
 
 Delphinium
 
 Demerara
 Demir Hisar
 Demon
 Denbigh Castle
 Dennis
 Dependence
 Deptford
 Deptford Prize
 Deptford Transport
 Derby
 Derby Haven
 
 Derg
 Derrington
 Dervish
 Derwent
 Desford
 Desire
 Desiree
 Despatch
 Desperante
 Desperate
 Destiny
 Destruction
 Determinee
 Detroit
 Deux Amis
 Deux Freres
 
 Devastation
 Deveron
 Devizes Castle
 
 Devonshire
 Dexterous
 Dextrous
 Dhyfe Castle
 Diable à Quatre
 Diadem
 Diamond
 
 
 Dianella
 Dianthus
 Dictator
 Dido
 Didon
 Dieppe
 
 Diligence
 Diligent
 Diligente
 Dilston
 Dingley
 Diomede
 Dipper
 Director
 
 
 
 
 Disdain
 Dispatch
 Dittany
 Dittisham
 Diver
 
 Dodman Point
 
 Dogstar
 Dolphin
 Dolphins Prize
 Dolwen
 Domett
 Dominica
 Dominion
 Don
 Doncaster
 Donegal
 Donovan
 Doon
 Dordrecht
 Doris
 Dorking
 Dornoch
 Dorothea
 Dorset
 Dorsetshire
 Doterel
 

 
 Dove
 Dover
 Dover Castle
 Dover Prize
 Dovey
 
 Downham
 Downley
 Dragon
 Dragon Prize
 Dragonfly
 Drake
 Dreadful
 Dreadnought
 Dreadnought Prize
 Driver
 Drochterland
 Dromedary
 
 Droxford
 Drudge
 Druid
 Drury
 Dryad
 Dubford
 Dublin
 
 Duc d'Aquitaine
 Duc de Chartres
 Duc de la Vauginon
 Duc d'Estissac
 
 
 
 
 
 
 
 
 
 
 Duckworth
 Duddon
 Dudley Castle
 Due Repulse
 Duff
 Dufferin
 Dufton
 Duguay-Trouin
 
 
 
 
 
 
 
 
 
 
 
 
 Duke William
 Dullisk Cove
 Dulverton
 Dumbarton
 Dumbarton Castle
 Dumbleton
 Dunbar
 Duncan
 Duncansby Head
 Dundalk
 Dundas
 Dundee
 Dundrum Bay
 Dunedin
 
 Dungeness
 Dunira
 Dunkerton
 
 
 
 
 
 Dunoon
 Dunster Castle
 
 Dunwich
 
 Duquesne
 Durban
 Durham
 Dursley Galley
 Durweston
 Dusky Queen
 Duthies
 Dwarf

E

 
 
 
 
 
 
 
 
 
 
 
 
 
 
 
 
 
 
 
 
 
 
 
 
 
 
 
 
 
 
 
 
 
 
 
 
 
 
 
 
 
 
 
 
 
 
 
 
 
 
 
 
 
 
 
 
 
 
 Eagle
 Eagle Shallop
 Eaglet
 Earl
 Earl of Chatham
 Earl of Denbigh
 Earl of Egmont
 
 Earl of Inchquin
 
 Earl of Northampton
 Earl of Peterborough
 Earl Roberts
 Earnest
 Eastbourne
 Easton
 Eastway
 
 Echo
 Eclair
 Eclipse
 Edderton
 Eden
 Edgar
 Edgeley
 Edinburgh
 Edlingham
 Edward
 

 Effingham
 Egeria
 Eggesford
 Eglantine
 Eglinton
 Egmont
 Egremont
 Egremont Castle
 Egret
 Egyptienne
 Eideren
 Ekins
 El Corso
 
 El Vivo
 Eleanor
 Electra
 Elephant
 Elf
 Elfin
 Elfreda
 Elgin
 Elias
 Eling
 Elizabeth
 Elizabeth & Sarah
 Elizabeth Bonaventure
 Elizabeth Jonas
 Elk
 Ellinor
 Ellinore

 Elphinstone
 Elsenham
 Eltham
 Elven
 Embleton
 Emerald
 Emersham
 Emilia
 Emilien
 Emily
 Emperor
 
 
 
 Empire Anvil
 Empire Arquebus
 Empire Audacity
 Empire Battleaxe
 Empire Broadsword
 
 
 Empire Comfort
 Empire Crossbow
 Empire Cutlass
 
 
 Empire Gauntlet
 Empire Halberd
 Empire Javelin
 Empire Lance
 Empire Mace
 Empire Peacemaker
 Empire Rapier
 Empire Rest
 Empire Shelter
 Empire Spearhead
 Empress
 Empress Mary
 
 
 
 
 
 

 
 Ems
 Emsworth
 Emulous
 Enard Bay
 Enchantress
 Encounter
 Endeavour
 Endeavour Bark
 Endeavour Transport
 Endurance
 Endymion
 
 Engageante
 
 
 
 Enterprize 
 Entreprenante
 Epervier
 Ephira
 Ephraim
 Epinal
 Epreuve
 Epsom
 Erebus
 Erica
 Eridanus
 Eridge
 Erin
 Erne
 Errant
 Eruption
 Escapade
 Escort
 Esk
 Eskdale
 Eskimo
 Esperance
 
 Esperanza
 Espiegle
 Espion
 Espoir
 
 
 
 
 Essington
 Esther
 Estridge
 Etchingham
 Ethalion
 Etna
 Etrusco
 Ettrick
 Eugenie
 Euphrates
 Euphrosyne
 Europa
 Eurotas
 Eurus
 Euryalus
 Eurydice
 Eustatia
 Evadne
 Evenlode
 Everingham
 Example
 Excalibur
 Excellent
 Exchange
 Exe
 
 
 
 Exmoor
 Exmouth
 Expedition
 Experiment
 Exploit
 Explorer
 Explosion
 Express
 Extravagant
 Eyderen
 Eyebright

F

 
 
 
 
 Fair Rhodian
 Fair Rosamond
 
 
 
 
 
 Fairy Queen
 
 
 
 
 
 Falcon Flyboat
 Falcon in the Fetterlock
 Falcon of the Tower
 
 Falkland Prize
 Falmouth
 Fama
 Fame
 Fancy
 Fandango
 Fanfan
 Fanny
 Fantome
 Fara Numa
 Fareham
 Farndale
 Farnham Castle
 Farragut
 Fastnet
 Faulknor
 Faversham
 Favorite
 Favourite
 Fawkner
 Fawn
 Fearless
 Felicidade
 Felicite
 Felicity
 
 Felixstowe
 Fellowship
 Felmersham
 Fencer
 Fenella
 Fennel
 Fenton
 Fermoy
 Fernie
 Feroze
 Ferret
 Ferreter
 Fertile Vale
 Fervent
 Feversham
 Fidelity
 Fidget
 Fierce
 
 Fife Ness
 Fifi
 Fighter
 Fiji
 Filey
 Finch
 Findhorn
 Finisterre
 Finwhale
 Fiona
 Fireball
 Firebrand
 Firedrake
 Firefly
 Firequeen
 Firm
 Firme
 Fisgard
 Fisgard II
 Fisgard III
 Fisgard IV
 Fisher Boy
 Fisher Girl
 Fishguard
 Fiskerton
 Fittleton
 Fitzroy
 Flambeau
 
 Flamborough Head
 Flamborough Prize
 Flame
 Flamer
 Flamingo
 Flash
 Flax
 Fleche
 Fleetwood
 Fleur de la Mer
 Fleur de Lys
 Flewende Fische
 Flight
 Flinders
 
 Flint Castle
 Flintham
 Flirt
 Flockton
 Flora
 Florentina
 Florida
 Floriston
 Florizel
 Flotta
 Flower de Luce
 Fly
 Flying Fish
 Flying Fox
 Flying Greyhound
 Foam
 Foley
 Folkeston
 Folkestone
 Force
 Ford
 Forerunner
 Fordham
 Foresight
 Forester
 
 Formidable
 Forres
 Fort Dee
 Fort Diamond
 Fort Royal
 Fort York
 Forte
 Forth
 Fortitude
 Fortituud
 
 Fortune Prize
 Fortunée
 Forward
 Fotheringay Castle
 Foudre
 Foudroyant
 Fougueux
 Fountain
 Fowey
 Fox
 Foxglove
 Foxhound
 
 
 Franchise
 Francis
 Franklin
 Fraserburgh
 
 Frederick
 Frederick William
 Frederickstein
 Frederickswaern
 Freesia

 French Ruby
 French Victory
 Frere
 Frettenham
 Freya
 Friendship
 Friezland
 Fritham
 Fritillary
 Frobisher
 Frog
 Frolic
 Frome
 Fubbs
 Fuerte
 Fuh Wo
 Fulmar
 Fulminate
 Furieuse
 Furious
 Furnace
 Fury
 Fuze
 Fyen

See also
 List of aircraft carriers of the Royal Navy
 List of amphibious warfare ships of the Royal Navy
 List of pre-dreadnought battleships of the Royal Navy
 List of dreadnought battleships of the Royal Navy
 List of battlecruisers of the Royal Navy
 List of cruiser classes of the Royal Navy
 List of destroyer classes of the Royal Navy
 List of patrol vessels of the Royal Navy
 List of frigate classes of the Royal Navy
 List of monitors of the Royal Navy
 List of mine countermeasure vessels of the Royal Navy (includes minesweepers and mine hunters)
 List of Royal Fleet Auxiliary ship names
 List of submarines of the Royal Navy
 List of survey vessels of the Royal Navy
 List of Royal Navy shore establishments

References
 

 D
Names D
Royal Navy D
Royal Navy ships D